Salem Sowdeswari College is located near Kondalampatti Bypass. It has both government aided courses and self-financing courses. Kondalampatti is a census town in Salem district.

Address
Salem Sowdeswari College,
Kondalampatti,
Salem-10.

There are 2 wings for this college.
Government aided &
Self Financing courses wing

Courses
BSc(Maths), BSc(Computer Science), MCA

External links

Education in Salem district
Colleges affiliated to Periyar University